Mario Álvarez (born 5 August 1960) is a Dominican Republic table tennis player. He competed in the men's singles and the men's doubles events at the 1988 Summer Olympics.

References

External links
 

1960 births
Living people
Dominican Republic male table tennis players
Olympic table tennis players of the Dominican Republic
Table tennis players at the 1988 Summer Olympics
Pan American Games medalists in table tennis
Pan American Games gold medalists for the Dominican Republic
Pan American Games silver medalists for the Dominican Republic
Pan American Games bronze medalists for the Dominican Republic
Medalists at the 1979 Pan American Games
Medalists at the 1983 Pan American Games
Medalists at the 1987 Pan American Games
Table tennis players at the 1979 Pan American Games
Table tennis players at the 1983 Pan American Games
Table tennis players at the 1987 Pan American Games
20th-century Dominican Republic people
21st-century Dominican Republic people